Tempest in the Colosseum was recorded on July 23, 1977 in the Denen Coliseum in Tokyo, Japan. Musicians for this performance were Herbie Hancock on keyboards, Freddie Hubbard on trumpet, Tony Williams on drums, Ron Carter on double bass, and Wayne Shorter on tenor and soprano saxophones. The album was released in late 1977 only in Japan by CBS/Sony.

Reception
The Allmusic review by Richard S. Ginell awarded the album 4 stars stating "Tempest is a good description, for this CD contains more volatile ensemble playing than its Columbia predecessor; clearly some tighter bonding took place since the trans-Pacific flight".

Track listing
"Eye of the Hurricane" (Hancock) - 16:38
"Diana" (Shorter) - 4:31
"Eighty-One" (Carter) - 13:08
"Maiden Voyage" (Hancock) - 11:55
"Lawra" (Williams) - 8:23
"Red Clay" (Hubbard) - 14:15

Personnel
 Herbie Hancock – keyboards, piano, synthesizer, vocals
 Ron Carter – bass
 Freddie Hubbard – trumpet
 Wayne Shorter – soprano saxophone, tenor saxophone
 Tony Williams – drums

References

Herbie Hancock live albums
1977 live albums
Albums produced by Dave Rubinson
Columbia Records live albums